Aytən Inglab gizi Mustafayeva (born 23 May 1968) is an Azerbaijani Independent politician who was a member of the National Assembly. She was elected at the 2015 Azerbaijani parliamentary election.

Early life 
Mustafayeva graduated in 1990 with honours from the Faculty of Oriental Studies at Baku State University.

Political career 
Mustafayeva was elected to the Parliament of Azerbaijan in 2015.

Personal life 
She was married to political scientist Roshen Mustafayev until his death in 2009. She remarried in 2016.

She is fluent in Russian, Turkish, English and Persian.

References 

Living people
1968 births
Members of the National Assembly (Azerbaijan)
Independent politicians in Azerbaijan
21st-century Azerbaijani women politicians
21st-century Azerbaijani politicians
Baku State University alumni
Women members of the National Assembly (Azerbaijan)
Members of the 5th convocation of the National Assembly (Azerbaijan)